Millicent Ellis Selsam (May 30, 1912 – October 12, 1996) was an American children's author.

Background

Selsam was born May 30, 1912, in New York City.  She became interested in biology during her high school years. She took this interest to college when she studied biology at Brooklyn College. She was then offered a fellowship teaching at Columbia University while completing an M.A. in botany.

Career

After receiving her M.A., Selsam taught high school science before deciding to write science discovery books for children in 1946. Her first book was Egg to Chick. After that her work found outlets at Harper & Row, Morrow, Macmillan, Doubleday and Walker, among other publishers. For some years she taught biology at Brooklyn College and in New York City high schools.

Selsam wrote over a hundred children's books and was married to the philosopher Howard Selsam. During her career, she was the recipient of many awards, including the 1965 Thomas Alva Edison Mass Media Award for best children's science book, Biography of an Atom.

Personal life and death

Selsam married Howard Selsam.  They had one child, Robert.

She died age 84 on October 12, 1996.

Selected works
Greg's Microscope, illustrated by Arnold Lobel
A First Look at Animals With Horns, with Joyce Hunt, illustrated by Harriett Springer
A First Look at Ducks, Geese, and Swans, with Joyce Hunt, illustrated by Harriett Springer
A First Look at Bats, with Joyce Hunt, illustrated by Harriett Springer
A First Look at Animals That Eat Other Animals, with Joyce Hunt, illustrated by Harriett Springer
A First Look at Dinosaurs, with Joyce Hunt, illustrated by Harriett Springer
Big Tracks, Little Tracks: Following Animal Prints, illustrated by Marlene Hill Donnelly
Questions and Answers About Horses, illustrated by Sandy Rabinowitz
Birth of an Island
Tony's Birds
Biography of an Atom, with Jacob Bronowski (1965 Edison Foundation winner for best children's science book)
Mushrooms, illustrated by Jerome Wexler
Egg to Chick, illustrated by Barbara M. Wolff
Seeds and More Seeds
How to Be a Nature Detective, illustrated by Ezra Jack Keats
More Potatoes!, pictures by Ben Schecter
Benny's Animals and How He Put Them in Order
How Puppies Grow, with photographs by Esther Bubley
How Kittens Grow, with photographs by Neil Johnson
Terry and the Caterpillars, illustrated by Arnold Lobel
Plenty of Fish
Sea Monsters of Long Ago
Stars, Mosquitoes, and Crocodiles : the American Travels of Alexander von Humboldt
Let's Get Turtles
Benny's Animals and How He Put Them in Order
Birth of an Island,  illustrated by Winifred Lubell
Big Tracks, Little Tracks: Following Animal Prints, illustrated by Marlene Hill Donnelly
The 'Don't Throw It, Grow It' Book of Houseplants
Keep Looking!, with Joyce Huntby, illustrated by Normand Chartier
Backyard Insects
All Kinds of Babies, illustrated by Symeon Shimin
See Through the Sea
See Through the Forest
See Through the Jungle
See Through the Lake
 Around the World with Darwin, illustrated by Anthony Ravielli
 All About Eggs and How They Change Into Animals, illustrated by Helen Ludwig
 Birth of a Forest illustrated by Barbara Wolff
 Up, Down and Around: the force of gravity
 The Plants We Eat, photographs by Jerome Wexler
 The Tomato and Other Fruit Vegetables
 Land of the Giant Tortoise: The Story of the Galapagos illustrated with photographs by Les Line
 You and the World Around You illustrated by Greta Elgaard
 Doubleday First Guide to Wild Flowers
 Hidden Animals
 The Tiger: Its Life in the Wild
 How Puppies
 Is this a Baby Dinosaur? and Other Science Picture Puzzles
 The Apple and Other Fruits
 How Kittens Grow
 Tony's Birds
 Animals as Parents
 The Courtship of Animals
 How Animals Live Together
 How Animals Tell Time
 The Language of Animals
 Maple Tree
 Microbes at Work
 Milkweed
 Peanut
 Plants that Heal
 Plants that Move
 The Plants We Eat
 Play with Plants
 Play with Seeds
 Play with Trees
 Underwater Zoos
 The Amazing Dandelion with pictures by Jerome Wexler
 Bulbs, Corms and Such with pictures by Jerome Wexler
 Eat the Fruit, Plant the Seed with pictures by Jerome Wexler
 The Harlequin Moth, Its Life Story with pictures by Jerome Wexler
 Maple Tree with pictures by Jerome Wexler
 Mimosa, the Sensitive Plant with pictures by Jerome Wexler
 Peanut with pictures by Jerome Wexler
 Popcorn with pictures by Jerome Wexler
 Vegetables from Stems and Leaves with pictures by Jerome Wexler
 How Kittens Grow
 How Puppies Grow
 All Kinds of Babies
 Questions and Answers about Ants
 Questions and Answers about Horses
 A First Look at Animals with Backbones
 Hidden Animals

See also

 Howard Selsam

References

External links
Millicent Ellis Selsam Papers in the de Grummond Collection

American non-fiction children's writers
American women children's writers
American children's writers
1912 births
1996 deaths
Brooklyn College alumni
20th-century American women